The Newlin Miller's House was built by William Newlin in the early nineteenth century in West Whiteland Township, Chester County, Pennsylvania, in the narrow valley of Little Broad Run, a tributary of the East Branch of  Brandywine Creek.  William inherited the land from his father, John Newlin, who bought the land in 1788.  He constructed the house and a  sawmill which was described in 1858 as a "frame sawmill with stone foundations driven by an 18 foot overshoot wheel with a 5 foot face."  The house has 2 stories and is banked into a hill.   It is built of "trash stone" and has a frame addition and porch.  The saw mill was owned by William Speakman, a local carpenter, from 1876 to 1895.  The mill has since been destroyed.

See also
Concordville, Pennsylvania
Newlin Mill Complex
Nicholas Newlin House

References

Houses on the National Register of Historic Places in Pennsylvania
Houses in Chester County, Pennsylvania
National Register of Historic Places in Chester County, Pennsylvania